Cho Hee-Soo (born January 11, 2000) is a South Korean figure skater.

Career
Competing on the novice level at the Asian Figure Skating Trophy, Cho won the novice silver medal in 2011 and placed fifth the following year. She finished fourth on the novice level at the 2012 Rooster Cup in France.

Cho competed at the JGP qualification competition held in South Korea, and she was given a spot for the JGP series. She ranked 10th at the 2015 JGP Bratislava with the total score of 124.24 points.

Making her senior international debut, she placed 9th at the 2016 CS Ondrej Nepela Memorial.

Programs

Competitive highlights
CS: Challenger Series; JGP: Junior Grand Prix

References

External links 
 

2000 births
Living people
South Korean female single skaters
Figure skaters from Seoul